McKalla Place is a planned Capital MetroRail commuter rail infill station in Austin, Texas. The station is being built to provide access to Q2 Stadium. Ground broke on construction on July 18, 2022  and operations are expected to begin as early as fall 2023. Construction costs are estimated at $13 million. Upon opening of the new stop, nearby Kramer station is expected to close.

References

Future Capital MetroRail stations
Proposed railway stations in the United States
Railway stations scheduled to open in 2023